Odie Oscar Porter (May 24, 1877 – May 2, 1903) was an American Major League Baseball pitcher. He played for the Philadelphia Athletics during the  season. He attended Indiana University.

References

Major League Baseball pitchers
Philadelphia Athletics players
Baseball players from Indiana
1877 births
1903 deaths
Dayton Old Soldiers players